The SSZ Stradale is an automobile developed by Tom Zatloukal, an Alfa Romeo racer and restorer, that was produced between 1984 and 1999. SSZ stands for Sprint Speciale Zatloukal. Based on the Giulietta SS, the aim was to produce a high-performance version with a lightweight and wider body than the standard production SS. 

The original intent had been to produce a one-off vehicle for personal use. The car was well received at Alfa club events and Alfa historian Pat Braden nicknamed the car "The Zatmobile" and published photos in Alfa Owner magazine. A second car was built for Joe Benson, author of the Alfa Romeo Buyers Guide. After several other customers expressed interest in purchasing a car, SSZ Motorcars was formed.

Prototypes 
A total of four prototypes were produced on Alfa 101 Sprint Speciale chassis. SSZ P1 has a steel body that is  wider and  lower than a standard SS, with a traditional hood and trunk. P2 incorporated a one-piece, fiberglass tilt front, perplex windows, and other lightweight components. The third prototype had tilt front and rear, side air outlets, a new taillight configuration, and an elongated greenhouse. The P4 added a hood scoop, wider wheel wells, and a mono wiper. Only P1 and P2 still exist as the P3 was destroyed during testing and the P4 was disassembled to pattern parts for production cars.

Mark 1 

The first production SSZ Stradale featured an all-new tubular chassis combined with a Kevlar-reinforced fiberglass body. These cars were powered by an Alfa Romeo 3.0 L V6 engine with a 5-speed overdrive transmission coupled to an adjustable ratio live axle. Standard features included four-wheel 12-inch driver-adjustable brakes, adjustable coil-over suspension, rack and pinion steering, front and rear adjustable sway bars, fuel cell, and a fire system.

Mark 2 

The transmission and rear axle were also upgraded. The body was widened, a front spoiler was added and a new rear clip was incorporated to increase downforce. Five Mark 2 cars are known to have been produced.

Mark 3 

Mark 3 cars were prepared in competition version only. The Electromotive 3.0 L twin-turbo engine developed . The cars had independent rear suspension and inboard disc brakes. A full flat bottom with a rear diffuser, air jacks, telemetry, and data acquisition were fitted. The body was wider, longer, and delivered with adjustable front and rear wings.

Mark 3.1 

Mark 3.1 cars had the same chassis and body as the 3.0 sans wings. The engines were Chevrolet LS6 aluminum V8s coupled to a Richmond 5-speed. The wheels were changed to a traditional 5-bolt pattern. Like the 3.0, the cars were sold for competition purposes and were available without an engine. Several cars have been converted to street use.

Mark 4 

These cars were mechanically the same as the 3.1. The body and chassis were  longer for high-speed stability. Racing development was discontinued at the end of the 1999 season due to upheaval within the sanctioning bodies.

Racing 

Stradales were campaigned in SCCA, USRRC, FIA GT, World Challenge, and Sports Car. Mark 1 and 2 cars won numerous events in SCCA club racing including the Continental Challenge and 5 track records. Elvira, the first Mk 3 auto, set three track records, had seven wins, and placed fifth in the United States Road Racing Championship. The Stradale competed in oval track, drag race, rally racing, and hill climb events with success.

Production Stats 
Years produced: 1984 - 1999

The SSZ is no longer being produced. The Motorama Auto Museum in Wisconsin features over fifty vintage Alfa Romeos, several SSZ Stradales, prototypes, and other cars from around the world.

Resources 

Rear-wheel-drive vehicles
Coupés
Sports car manufacturers
W
Car manufacturers of the United States